The 2006-07 Michigan Wolverines men's basketball team represented the University of Michigan in intercollegiate college basketball during the 2006-07 season. The team played its home games in the Crisler Arena in Ann Arbor, Michigan, and was a member of the Big Ten Conference.  Under the direction of head coach Tommy Amaker, the team finished tied for seventh in the Big Ten Conference.  The team earned an eighth seed and advanced to the quarterfinals of the 2007 Big Ten Conference men's basketball tournament.  The team earned an invitation to the 2007 National Invitation Tournament. The team was unranked for all eighteen weeks of Associated Press Top Twenty-Five Poll, and it also ended the season unranked in the final USA Today/CNN Poll. The team had a 1–5 record against ranked opponents, with its lone victory coming against #24 Indiana 58–55 on February 17, 2007 at Crisler Arena.

Lester Abram served as team captains, and Dion Harris earned team MVP honors.  The team's leading scorers were Harris (469 points), Courtney Sims (401 points) and Abram (319 points).   The leading rebounders were Sims (218), Brent Petway (205) and Ekpe Udoh (139).

Harris won the Big Ten Conference free throw percentage statistical championship with an 87.3% average in conference games.

In the 2007 Big Ten Conference men's basketball tournament at the United Center from March 8–11, Michigan was seeded eighth.  In the first round, they defeated number 9 Minnesota 49–40 before losing to number 1 Ohio State 72–62 in the second round.

On March 13, 2007,  Michigan defeated six seeded  68–58 at Crisler Arena in the first round of the 2007 National Invitation Tournament. Then Michigan lost to two seeded  87–66 at the Donald L. Tucker Center in Tallahassee, Florida in the second round.

Team Players Drafted into the NBA

*Transferred to Baylor Bears basketball before being drafted

See also
Michigan Wolverines men's basketball
2007 National Invitation Tournament
NIT all-time team records
NIT bids by school and conference
NIT championships and semifinal appearances

References

External links
stats @ ESPN

Michigan Wolverines men's basketball seasons
Michigan
Michigan
Michigan
Michigan